Davide-Jerome Itter (born 5 January 1999) is a German professional footballer who plays as a right-back or right midfielder for  club VfL Osnabrück.

Early and personal life
Itter was born in Gießen. He is the twin brother of fellow professional footballer Gian-Luca Itter, the son of former amateur player Frank Itter and grandson of Oswald Itter, who played for FC Cleeberg before his career was ended by a meniscus injury, aged 18.

Club career
Itter played youth football for FC Cleeberg, Eintracht Frankfurt and VfL Wolfsburg alongside his twin brother Gian-Luca. He made his senior debut for VfL Wolfsburg II in 2018 and scored once in 38 appearances for the reserve side across three seasons. in June 2021, he signed for 3. Liga club VfL Osnabrück on a two-year contract.

International career
Itter has represented Germany at under-16, under-17, under-19 and under-20 levels, and was part of their squad for the 2016 UEFA European Under-17 Championship.

References

External links

1999 births
Living people
German footballers
Sportspeople from Giessen
Footballers from Hesse
Association football fullbacks
Association football wingers
Eintracht Frankfurt players
VfL Wolfsburg players
VfL Wolfsburg II players
VfL Osnabrück players
Regionalliga players
3. Liga players
Germany youth international footballers
Twin sportspeople
German twins